Todhills is a village in County Durham, in England. It is situated a few miles to the north of Bishop Auckland, between Newfield and Byers Green.

References

Villages in County Durham